Sing meinen Song – Das Tauschkonzert ( "Sing My Song – The Exchange Concert") is a German reality television series produced by Schwartzkopff TV Productions and broadcast on German television station VOX. Part of The Best Singers series, it is based on the Dutch series De beste zangers van Nederland. The inaugural series launched on 22 April 2014.

Season 1

The first German season of Sing meinen Song included the following artists: Sarah Connor, Andreas Gabalier, Sandra Nasić, Sasha, Roger Cicero, Gregor Meyle and Xavier Naidoo.

Show 1 – Sasha

Show 2 – Sandra Nasić

Show 3 – Andreas Gabalier

Show 4 – Roger Cicero

Show 5 – Sarah Connor

Show 6 – Gregor Meyle

Show 7 – Xavier Naidoo

Season 2

Show 1 – Yvonne Catterfeld

Show 2 – Andreas Bourani

Show 3 – Die Prinzen

Show 4 – Christina Stürmer

Show 5 – Hartmut Engler

Show 6 – Daniel Wirtz

Show 7 – Xavier Naidoo (Söhne Mannheims)

Season 3

Show 1 – Nena

Show 2 – Seven

Show 3 – The BossHoss

Show 4 – Samy Deluxe

Show 5 – Wolfgang Niedecken

Show 6 – Annett Louisan

Show 7 – Xavier Naidoo

Accompanying album
The album to accompany the series ("Sing meinen Song - Das Tauschkonzert Vol. 3") comprised 14 tracks (2 by each of the participants). The deluxe version comprised 5 tracks performed in the shows by Xavier Naidoo and 4 by each of the other participants.  In May 2016 it entered the German charts at No.2.

Season 4

The fourth season of Sing meinen Song included the following artists: The BossHoss, Stefanie Kloß, Gentleman, Mark Forster, Lena, Michael Patrick Kelly, and Moses Pelham.

Show 1 – Mark Forster

Show 2 – Stefanie Kloß

Show 3 – Lena

Show 4 – Moses Pelham

Show 5 – Michael Patrick Kelly

Show 6 – Gentleman

Show 7 – The BossHoss

Season 5

The fifth season of Sing meinen Song included the following artists: Mark Forster, Mary Roos, Rea Garvey, Judith Holofernes, Johannes Strate, Leslie Clio and Marian Gold.

Show 1 – Johannes Strate

Show 2 – Rea Garvey

Show 3 – Judith Holofernes

Show 4 – Marian Gold

Show 5 – Mary Roos

Show 6 – Leslie Clio

Show 7 – Mark Forster

Season 6
In October 2018, it was announced that Michael Patrick Kelly will replace Mark Forster as the show's host in season six.  Kelly will be joined by Belgian musician Milow and Spanish-German singer Álvaro Soler as well as German singers Wincent Weiss, Johannes Oerding, Jeanette Biedermann, and Jennifer Haben from metal band Beyond the Black.

See also
The Best Singers (series)

References

German music television series
German reality television series
2014 German television series debuts
German-language television shows
VOX (German TV channel) original programming